The HAL HTT-40 (Hindustan Turbo Trainer-40) is an Indian training aircraft designed and built by Hindustan Aeronautics Limited (HAL). It will replace the Indian Air Force's retired HPT-32 Deepak as a basic trainer.

Design and development
The HTT-40 is a tandem seat trainer aircraft powered by a  turboprop engine. In early 2012 the company forecast building 106 examples.

By the middle of 2012 the aircraft's future was in doubt as the Indian Air Force ordered 75 Pilatus PC-7 Mk IIs to fill the role envisioned for the HTT-40. In September 2012 the Air Force indicated that it had formally rejected the HTT-40 for service based on its cost per aircraft being double that of the PC-7 Mk II, a proven aircraft, already in service worldwide. An MoD official noted, "We would be willing to pay higher rates to build indigenous capability in strategic defence equipment. But can HAL argue that the capability to build basic trainers is strategically vital[?]"

At that time HAL did not confirm the IAF announcement that it will not buy the HTT-40, nor did the company indicate whether the aircraft's development will be continued. A company spokesman said, "We treat all MOD issues/proposals as confidential...All our projects are conceived with national interest in mind though, at times, some of those take time to fructify".

Once the HTT-40 started flying, the Indian Air Force commander publicly stated that IAF will buy the HTT-40 in large numbers.

On 28 February 2015, it was reported that the Indian defense ministry had selected 68 HAL HTT-40 trainers and 38 Pilatus trainers to replace its current trainer fleet, stating that this move was "commercially viable".

On 21 June 2015, HAL chose the Honeywell Garrett TPE331-12B turboprop to power the trainer. The deal was signed on 27 July 2022, for 88 engines, kits, maintenance and support worth more than $100 million. Honeywell will work with HAL to extend support for exports.  

HAL rolled out the first prototype on 2 February 2016 and it first flew on 31 May 2016.

The HTT-40 made its first public introduction flight on 17 June 2016, with Defence Minister Manohar Parrikar in attendance at the HAL airport in Bangalore. On 19 May 2017, the second prototype had its first flight.

In July 2019 it was anticipated that initial operational clearance would be reached by end of 2019 and that, after placement of an order, the first aircraft would be delivered to the IAF within a year. In January 2020, HAL forecast that limited series production is to start in year 2020-21. On 11 August 2020, the Defence Acquisition Council approved procuring 106 HTT-40s for the Indian Air Force. At Aero India 2021, HAL received request for proposal from the IAF for 70 HTT40s with an option for 38 more. Production will take place at the Bangalore and Nashik manufacturing plants.

By August 2021, the HTT-40 had completed its spin certification flight testing. The platform received its provisional certificate of airworthiness from the Centre for Military Airworthiness and Certification (CEMILAC) on 6 June 2022. At DefExpo 2022, IAF and HAL concluded ₹6,800 crore contract for 70 HTT-40. The remaining 36 will be procured after operationalization of HTT-40 fleet.

Operators

 Indian Air Force — 70 on order,  with the possibility of an additional 38 aircraft.

Specifications (HTT-40)

See also

References

External links

HTT-40
2010s Indian military trainer aircraft
Single-engined tractor aircraft
Single-engined turboprop aircraft
Low-wing aircraft
Aircraft first flown in 2016